Paul John Anthony (January 23, 1924 – May 21, 1993) was an American professional basketball player. He played for the Tri-Cities Blackhawks in the National Basketball League for one game in each of the 1946–47 and 1947–48 seasons. He competed in several other leagues as well.

References

1924 births
1993 deaths
American men's basketball players
Basketball players from Pennsylvania
Centers (basketball)
Forwards (basketball)
People from Glassport, Pennsylvania
Tri-Cities Blackhawks players
Washington & Jefferson Presidents men's basketball players